Hwaaksan  is a mountain in South Korea whose area extends over Gapyeong County, Gyeonggi-do and Hwacheon County, Gangwon-do.

See also
 List of mountains in Korea

Notes

References
 

Mountains of South Korea
Gapyeong County
Hwacheon County
Mountains of Gangwon Province, South Korea
Mountains of Gyeonggi Province
One-thousanders of South Korea